Trans-la-Forêt is a commune in the Ille-et-Vilaine department in Brittany in northwestern France.

It is the site of the 939 AD Battle of Trans-la-Forêt.

Population

See also
Communes of the Ille-et-Vilaine department

References

External links

Mayors of Ille-et-Vilaine Association 

Communes of Ille-et-Vilaine